The 2018 Professional Women's Bowling Association (PWBA) Tour retains a similar schedule to the 2017 season, with nine standard tournaments and four majors, but includes two changes.  First, the final round of each standard tournament will now be contested in the bowling center where the qualifying rounds occurred. (In the three previous seasons, these final rounds took place in the center where the next major tournament came up on the schedule.) Second, the final three standard events of the year will feature an “Elite Field” of 24 bowlers, based on season-to-date points list, that are automatically placed into the top 32 for match play. The remaining players will bowl a qualifying round for the other eight spots in match play.

The final rounds of the first six standard tournaments will air live on a PBA Xtra Frame Webcast. CBS Sports Network will air the final round of the three Elite Field standard tournaments and all major tournaments live.

The season's final event and final major, the PWBA Tour Championship, is an invitational featuring a starting field of only 16 bowlers. Tournament winners from the current season gain automatic entry into the starting field, with the remaining spots given to bowlers with the highest 2018 point totals among non-winners. The championship is set up in a bracketed elimination format, with players seeded 1-16 based on YTD points.  The #5 through #16 seeds compete in Round 1, with the six winners joining the #3 and #4 seeds in the eight-player second round. The four winners from Round 2 then compete in Round 3, with the two survivors of those matches joining the #1 and #2 seeds in the four-player televised finals. All rounds leading up to the single-elimination televised finals are best three-of-five match play.

An additional PWBA title was available at the Striking Against Breast Cancer Mixed Doubles tournament, a cross-over event with the PBA Tour held on July 26-29 in Houston, Texas.

Season awards and statistics

Player awards
 PWBA Player of the Year: Shannon O'Keefe
 PWBA Rookie of the Year: Jordan Richard

2018 points leaders
1. Shannon O'Keefe (130,050)
2. Danielle McEwan (116,387.5)
3. Stefanie Johnson (102,115)

2018 average leaders
1. Erin McCarthy (217.46)
2. Jordan Richard (217.43)
3. Danielle McEwan (216.41)

2018 final round appearances
1. Shannon O'Keefe (7)
2. Danielle McEwan (6)
3. Jordan Richard (5)

Tournament summary

Below is a list of events scheduled for the 2018 PWBA Tour season. Major tournaments are in bold. Career PWBA title numbers for winners are shown in parenthesis (#).

C: broadcast on CBS Sports Network
X: broadcast on the PBA's Xtra Frame Webcast service

References

External links
PWBA.com, home of the Professional Women' Bowling Association

2018 in bowling